Instlux is a program for Windows which allows the user to install a Linux distribution from an ISO image. It is included on openSUSE since the 10.3 release.

See also 
 Wubi (Ubuntu installer)

References

External links 
 

Linux installation software
Windows-only free software